William George Thompson (born 6 October 1960) is an English technology writer, best known for his weekly column in the Technology section of BBC News Online and his appearances on Digital Planet, a radio show on the BBC World Service. He is also an honorary senior visiting fellow at City University London's  Journalism Department and writes for BBC WebWise.

Biography 
Born in Jarrow, County Durham, Thompson grew up in Corby, Northamptonshire. He graduated from St Catharine's College, Cambridge in philosophy and with a diploma in computing in 1984 and worked at Acorn Computers.

He was a correspondent for the technology programme The Big Byte on BBC Radio. He began to write for The Guardian in 1990, and in 1994 went to work there (having previously worked at Pipex, the United Kingdom's first commercial Internet service provider) as head of new media, setting up the paper's website, which he argued should not be paywalled. He left in 1996 to work as a freelance writer and consultant. In November 2009 he took on a role as head of partnership development for Archive Development projects at the BBC, working with Tony Ageh (formerly of The Guardian), the then Controller of Archive Development at the BBC.

Thompson is a trustee of the Britten Sinfonia, and a board member of the Writers' Centre Norwich. In 2010, he was nominated for the Prudential Arts and Business Board Member of the year award. In October 2016, Anglia Ruskin University awarded Thompson an Honorary Doctor of Arts degree.

He is chair of Centre for Doctoral Training advisory board and a member of the main advisory board of the Web Science Institute at the University of Southampton.

He has two children.

Bibliography 

Thompson has also written books for children:

References

External links

 Autobiographical article (last updated September 2005)
 
 Bill Thompson's blog
 Bill Thompson's personal website
 Bill Thompson on BBC Make IT Digital at TNMOC
 

1960 births
Living people
Alumni of the University of Cambridge
British non-fiction writers
British technology writers
English atheists
People from Corby
People from Jarrow
Writers from Tyne and Wear
BBC people
English male writers
British technology journalists
Male non-fiction writers